The Langenthal–Oensingen railway line is a  railway line in the cantons of Bern and Solothurn, in Switzerland. Aare Seeland mobil owns and operates the line.

History 
The line was electrified from opening at 1000 V DC, later rebuilt to 1200 V DC. The company abandoned the section between Oensingen and Oensingen Schulhaus on 14 May 1928.

The Langenthal-Jura Railway merged with the Langenthal–Melchnau-Bahn in 1958 to form the Oberaargau-Jura Railways in 1958. The company was renamed Regionalverkehr Oberaargau in 1990. Regionalverkehr Oberaargau and two other companies merged in 1999 to form Aare Seeland mobil, who continues to own and operate the line.

Between 2010 and 2012, Aare Seeland mobil built a  extension between Niederbipp and Oensingen, using a different alignment from the original routing. This extension opened for service in October 2012.

Route 
The line begins at Langenthal, where Aare Seeland mobil (ASm) has an island platform on the north side of the station. From Niederbipp, the 2012 extension follows the right-of-way of the Jura Foot Line to Oensingen. At Oensingen, ASm has an island platform at the north side of the station.

Operation 
 Aare Seeland mobil operates half-hourly service over the line. Trains originate in Solothurn, run via Niederbipp to Oensingen, then backtrack via Niederbipp to Langenthal.

Notes

References 
 

Metre gauge railways in Switzerland
Railway lines in Switzerland
Railway lines opened in 1907
1907 establishments in Switzerland
Aare Seeland mobil railway lines
1200 V DC railway electrification